The Town of Hillrose is a statutory town located in Morgan County, Colorado, United States. The town population was 312 at the 2020 United States Census, an 18.18% increase since the 2010 United States Census.

History
The town was named after Rose Hill Emerson, daughter of early landholder.

Geography
Hillrose is located at  (40.325591, -103.521475).

Demographics

As of the census of 2000, there were 254 people, 93 households, and 69 families residing in the town. The racial makeup of the town was 92.52% White, 1.57% Native American, 0.39% Pacific Islander, 4.33% from other races, and 1.18% from two or more races. Hispanic or Latino of any race were 16.14% of the population.

There were 93 households, out of which 34.4% had children under the age of 18 living with them, 62.4% were married couples living together, 8.6% had a female householder with no husband present, and 25.8% were non-families. 18.3% of all households were made up of individuals, and 4.3% had someone living alone who was 65 years of age or older.  The average household size was 2.73 and the average family size was 3.14.

In the town, the population was spread out, with 30.7% under the age of 18, 5.1% from 18 to 24, 30.3% from 25 to 44, 22.4% from 45 to 64, and 11.4% who were 65 years of age or older.  The median age was 36 years. For every 100 females, there were 111.7 males.  For every 100 females age 18 and over, there were 102.3 males.

The median income for a household in the town was $29,219, and the median income for a family was $30,750. Males had a median income of $23,333 versus $17,750 for females. The per capita income for the town was $11,179.  About 8.5% of families and 10.4% of the population were below the poverty line, including 8.0% of those under the age of eighteen and 35.7% of those 65 or over.

Climate
According to the Köppen Climate Classification system, Hillrose has a semi-arid climate, abbreviated "BSk" on climate maps.

See also

List of municipalities in Colorado
List of places in Colorado
List of statistical areas in Colorado
Fort Morgan, CO Micropolitan Statistical Area

References

External links

Town of Hillrose website
CDOT map of the Town of Hillrose

Towns in Morgan County, Colorado
Towns in Colorado